Igreja de São Fins de Friestas is a church in Portugal. It is classified as a National Monument.

Churches in Viana do Castelo District
National monuments in Viana do Castelo District